Alejandro Bahena Flores (born 22 April 1953) is a Mexican politician from the National Action Party. From 2009 to 2012 he served as Deputy of the LXI Legislature of the Mexican Congress representing Baja California.

References

1953 births
Living people
Politicians from Guerrero
People from Taxco
National Action Party (Mexico) politicians
21st-century Mexican politicians
Deputies of the LXI Legislature of Mexico
Members of the Chamber of Deputies (Mexico) for Baja California